Performance Network Theatre, founded in 1981, was Ann Arbor, Michigan's premiere professional Equity theatre. It produced a wide variety of dramas, classics, comedies, Pulitzer Prize and Tony award-winners, many of which were World or Michigan Premieres. Its professional season included five to seven main stage productions. Other programming included seasonal productions that ran in repertory over the holiday season, the Northern Writers' Project—a week-long playwriting intensive, children's programming, the Fireside Festival of New Plays, the Open Table Series, the Open Stage series, music and more.

On December 18, 2015,  the Theatre announced that it would close at the conclusion of the year.

Overview
Performance Network was a 501 (c)(3) nonprofit organization that began its tenure in Ann Arbor in 1981.  Performance Network became Ann Arbor's professional theatre in September 1997 and built an elegant theatre in the heart of downtown in September 2000.

Performance Network's primary stage, the Shure Theater, was an intimate space that seated 139 patrons.

History 

David Bernstein and Jim Moran founded the Performance Network Theatre in 1981 as an arts collective. In addition to Bernstein and Moran, active collective members in the playwriting group included Lyn Coffin, Davi Napoleon, Judith Ottmar, Al Sjoerdsma and Rochel Urist. The theatre evolved into a nonprofit corporation in the mid-eighties. After the departure of the original founders, the organization continued to produce and present experimental, original and socially relevant work under the cooperative direction of Linda Kendall, Annemarie Stoll, Johanna Broughton, (and in time, Peter Knox). Eventually, the early 1990s saw departures from the artistic staff leave the artistic direction in the hands of Johanna Broughton, who (with her husband Dan Walker, along with Carla Milarch and David Wolber) led the theatre from the 'Warehouse Years' to professional status and in 2000 moved it from Ann Arbor's Washington Street location to the corner of 4th and Huron, near the Kerrytown district. In 1997, Performance Network secured a contract with Actors’ Equity and established itself as Ann Arbor's professional theatre.  In doing so, it was able to
 Increase the reputation of the Network by placing it in a higher tier of theatres nationally
 Gain access to plays of nationally recognized merit, unavailable to community theatres
 Increase artistic quality by hiring more experienced actors, directors, and designers
 Gain listing in respected theatrical publications and presentation by participating in the Michigan Equity Theatre Alliance, the National New Play Network, and Theatre Communication Group
 Expand the audience base by gaining press coverage in Southeastern Michigan publications.
In 2003, direction of the theatre was turned over to Milarch and Wolber. Under Milarch and Wolber, Performance Network excelled at choosing a wide range of artistically challenging shows and began receiving multiple awards for artistic quality. In order to continue producing high quality work Milarch decided to join Wolber in the Artistic department.  In 2012, Performance Network switched to a dual leadership structure and hired Erin Sabo to partner with Wolber. In May 2014, the Board of Directors suspended all operations, as the theater did not have resources to pay its staff, actors and vendors in a timely manner, and to make debt payments.  In July 2014, the Board announced that the theatre would reopen under the management of local actor-directors John Manfredi and Suzi Regan. Under the new management team, the Network produced one and a half seasons.  Despite excellent reviews for some of the productions,  both ticket sales and donations dropped precipitously.  In October 2015, the theatre announced that unless it could raise $50,000 before Thanksgiving, it would need to close its doors permanently.  The funding campaign failed to reach its goal.  In December, the staff and Board of Directors announced that the theatre company was no longer sustainable.

Programs

Professional Season 
The professional season included classic and contemporary plays under a Small Professional Theatre contract with Actors’ Equity Association.  Performance Network strived to include a classic play, musical, and world premiere in each season.  The season began in the fall and ran a full year.

Patrons could purchase a subscription to the professional season that gives them tickets at a discounted rate.  Alternatively, patrons could purchase "Flex Tickets" or anytime tickets to use in any combination for any number of shows they pleased over the course of the season.

Apprenticeships and Internships 
Performance Network's Apprenticeship program offered an intensive year-long paid position.  The apprenticeship offered hands-on training in the areas of stage management, house management, development, marketing, and technical theatre.  Apprentices developed a well-rounded experience in all aspects of theatre management.

Internships provided applicants a comprehensive experience in all elements of professional theatre, including box office, house management, and technical and clerical skills.  Unlike the apprenticeship, which allowed apprentices to experience multiple areas of theatre, interns selected which field they would like to focus on.

Staff, Board of Directors, and Associate Artists
In the Theatre's final 18 months, its staff members included:
 John Manfredi, Executive Director
 Suzi Regan, Artistic Director
 Sara Dean, Company Manager
 Meghan Bortle, Apprentice
 Melissa Mercieca, Apprentice

Past staff members include:
 Erin Sabo, Managing Director
 David Wolber, Artistic Director
 Carla Milarch, Associate Artistic Director
 Logan Ricket, Associate Development Director
 Joshua Parker, Technical Director
 Jennifer Pan, Assistant Technical Director & Graphic Designer
 Becky Fox, Director of Outreach and Education
 Anna Simmons, Company Manager & Resident Stage Manager
 Dayne White Bull, Marketing Assistant
 Justin Dietzel, Apprentice
 Eric Hohnke, Apprentice
 Jahmeel Powers, Apprentice
 Derek Ridge, Apprentice

Board of Directors
 Ron Maurer, President
 Mary Avrakotos, Treasurer
 Tom DeZure, Vice-president
 Steve Gerber, Secretary
 Ed Abbott
 Barbara Bach
 Norman Bash
 Heather Bell
 Gene Dickirson
 Hanna Goodstein
 Terry Heck
 David Herzig
 Steve Klein
 Jessica Litman
 Sheila Sasser
 Phil Stoffregen

Associate Artists
 Naz Edwards
 Monika Essen
 Sarab Kamoo
 Will Myers
 Jan Radcliff
 Chelsea Sadler
 John Seibert
 Malcolm Tulip
 Daniel C. Walker
 David Wells
 Leigh Woods
 Joseph Zettelmaier

Production history 
The 2015–2016 season
(Suzi Regan, artistic director) 
 Who's Afraid of Virginia Woolf? by Edward Albee—Holiday Shows:
 Why Not Me? A Sammy Davis Jr. Story by Tim Rhoze
 Dickens: An A Capella Carol by Charles Dickens

The 2014–2015 season
(Suzi Regan, artistic director)
Driving Miss Daisy by Alfred Uhry
This Wonderful Life by Steve Murray
Gift of the Magi by Annie Martin and Suzi Regan
Yellow Man by Dael Orlandersmith
Stones in His Pockets by Marie Jones
Salvage by Joseph Zettelmaier
Other Desert Cities by Jon Robin Baitz A co-production with the Jewish Ensemble Theatre (Michigan Premiere)

The 2013–2014 season:
(David Wolber, artistic director)
 An Iliad adapted by Lisa Peterson & Denis O'Hare, based on Homer's Iliad (Michigan Premiere)
 Jerry's Girls with Music and Lyrics by Jerry Herman, Concepts by Larry Alford, Wayne Cilento, and Jerry Herman
 County Line by David Wells (World Premiere)
 Venus In Fur by David Ives (Michigan Premiere)
 Richard III by William Shakespeare

The 2012–2013 Season:
(David Wolber, artistic director)
 The Glass Menagerie by Tennessee Williams
 A Little Night Music with Music and Lyrics by Stephen Sondheim, Book by Hugh Wheeler
 Brill by David Wells, Music by Frank Allison (World Premiere)
 Good People by David Lindsay-Abaire (Michigan Premiere)
 The Mountaintop by Katori Hall (Michigan Premiere)
 Becky Shaw by Gina Gionfriddo (Michigan Premiere)
 My Name is Asher Lev by Aaron Posner, Adapted from the novel by Chaim Potok (Michigan Premiere), a co-production with the Jewish Ensemble Theatre

The 2011–2012 season:
(David Wolber, artistic director)
 Time Stands Still by Donald Margulies (Michigan Premiere)
 Ain't Misbehavin': The Fats Waller Musical Show, conceived by Richard Maltby, Jr. and Murray Horwitz
 God of Carnage by Yasmina Reza, translated by Christopher Hampton (Michigan Premiere)
 Dead Man's Shoes by Joseph Zettelmaier (World Premiere)
 Red by John Logan (Michigan Premiere)
 In the Next Room (or The Vibrator Play)  by Sarah Ruhl (Michigan Premiere)
 Burn This by Lanford Wilson

The 2010–2011 season:
(David Wolber, artistic director)
 Sonia Flew by Melinda Lopez (Michigan Premiere), a co-production with the Jewish Ensemble Theatre
 The Drowsy Chaperone, Book by Bob Martin and Don McKellar, Music and Lyrics by Lisa Lambert and Greg Morrison (Michigan Premiere)
 The War Since Eve by Kim Carney (World Premiere)
 The Piano Lesson by August Wilson
 Circle Mirror Transformation by Annie Baker (Michigan Premiere)
 Next Fall by Geoffrey Nauffts (Michigan Premiere)
 Marie Antoinette: The Color of Flesh by Joel Gross (Michigan Premiere)

The 2009–2010 season:
(David Wolber, artistic director)
The Blonde, the Brunette and the Vengeful Redhead by Robert Hewett (Michigan Premiere) 
Christmas Carol'd by Joseph Zettelmaier (World Premiere)
K2 by Patrick Meyers
It Came From Mars by Joseph Zettelmaier (World Premiere), a co-production with Williamston Theatre
Little Shop of Horrors Book/Lyrics by Howard Ashman, Music by Alan Menken
The Seafarer by Conor McPherson (Michigan Premiere)
Woman Before a Glass by Lanie Robertson (Michigan Premiere)

The 2008–2009 season:
(David Wolber, artistic director)
Nine Parts of Desire (play) by Heather Raffo 
Geoffrey and Jeffrey by Kim Carney (World Premiere)
Rosencrantz and Guildenstern are Dead by Tom Stoppard
A Feminine Ending by Sarah Treem (Michigan Premiere)
Fences by August Wilson
A Picasso by Jeffrey Hatcher (Michigan Premiere)

The 2007–2008 season:
(Carla Milarch/David Wolber, artistic director)
The Clean House by Sarah Ruhl (Michigan Premiere)
The Baker's Wife by Joseph Stein and Stephen Schwartz
Souvenir (play) by Stephen Temperley (Michigan Premiere), a co-production with Boarshead Theatre
Doubt by John Patrick Shanley
Exits and Entrances by Athol Fugard (Michigan premiere)
The Little Dog Laughed by Douglas Carter Beane (Michigan Premiere)
The Day Everything Went Wrong by Malcolm Tulip (World Premiere)

The 2006–2007 season:
(Carla Milarch, artistic director)
The Retreat From Moscow by William Nicholson (Michigan Premiere)
The Fantasticks by Harvey Schmidt, book and lyrics by Tom Jones
Language Lessons by Joseph Zettelmaier (World Premiere)
Candida by George Bernard Shaw
Amadeus by Peter Shaffer
Dirty Blonde by Claudia Shear (Michigan Premiere)

The 2005–2006 season:
(Carla Milarch, artistic director)
Ice Glen by Joan Ackermann (NNPN rolling world premiere)
Jacob Marley's Christmas Carol by Tom Mula (Michigan premiere)
Moonglow by Kim Carney (world premiere), a co-production with Boarshead Theatre
A Doll's House by Henrik Ibsen
A Life In The Theatre by David Mamet
I Am My Own Wife by Doug Wright (Michigan premiere)

The 2004–2005 Season:
(Carla Milarch, artistic director)
Humble Boy by Charlotte Jones (September–October 2004)
She Loves Me by Joe Masteroff, lyrics by Sheldon Harnick, music by Jerry Bock (November–December 2004) 
Boston Marriage by David Mamet (January–February 2005)  (Michigan premiere)
The Stillness Between Breaths by Joseph Zettelmaier (March–April 2005) (world premiere)
Summer and Smoke by Tennessee Williams (April–May 2005) 
Take Me Out by Richard Greenberg (July–August 2005)  (Michigan premiere)
 
The 2003–2004 Season:
(Carla Milarch, artistic director)
The Sins of Sor Juana by Karen Zacarias (September–October 2003)  (Michigan premiere)
Tongue of a Bird by Ellen McLaughlin (October–November 2003) (Michigan premiere)
The Home Team by Kim Carney (November–December 2003) (world premiere)
Spike Heels by Theresa Rebeck (January–February 2004) (Michigan premiere)
Kimberly Akimbo by David Lindsay-Abaire (March–April 2004) (Michigan premiere)
The Threepenny Opera by Bertolt Brecht, music by Kurt Weill, translated by Robert David MacDonald (April–May 2004) 
 
The 2002–2003 Season:
(Daniel C. Walker, artistic director)
Defying Gravity by Jane Anderson (Michigan premiere)
The Spirit House by Adam Kraar (world premiere)
Man of La Mancha
Necessary Targets by Eve Ensler (Michigan premiere)
Copenhagen by Michael Frayn 
Sin by Wendy MacLeod (Michigan premiere)
2003 TreeTown Performance Festival (June-Aug 2003)
Peter Sparling Dance Company 
Brilliant traces 
Mosaic Youth Theatre - Reality
Brass Tacks - A Work in Progress
Terpsichore's Kitchen - Dancing in Summer
LIMF Nodes - The Blue Hour by David Mamet 
Pangea - The Search for Intelligent Improv in the Universe
Rowen Education Network - Candy Corn, Christ, and the Convoluted Creation of Golf

The 2001–2002 Season:
(Daniel C. Walker, artistic director)
Taking Leave by Nagle Jackson (Michigan premiere)
It's All True by Jason Sherman (Michigan premiere)
Stop Kiss by Diana Son (Michigan premiere)
Elizabeth Rex by Timothy Findley (American premiere)
The White Rose by Lillian Garrett-Groag (Michigan premiere)
Special Relativity by Richard Strand (world premiere)
2002 TreeTown Performance Festival (June-Aug 2002): 
Peter Sparling Dance Company 
Dada Boy Paints on Canvas 
Mosaic Youth Theatre - Heartbeat 
Chimera Theatre's A Streetcar Named Desire by Tennessee Williams
James McNeill Whistler 
Terpsichore's Kitchen - Dancing in Summer 
Ground Zen and Skinny Arms 
Collection 
Anton in Show Business

The 2000–2001 Season:
(Daniel C. Walker, artistic director)
The Maiden's Prayer by Nicky Silver (Michigan premiere)
Wit by Margaret Edson (Michigan premiere)
Fuddy Meers by David Lindsay-Abaire (Michigan premiere)
Maggie Rose by Kim Carney (world premiere)
Struggling Truths by Peter Mellencamp (world premiere)
Art by Yasmina Reza, translated by Christopher Hampton (Michigan premiere)

The 1999–2000 Season:
(Daniel C. Walker, artistic director)
As Bees in Honey Drown (Michigan premiere)
Not Waving by Gen LeRoy (Michigan premiere)
Three Days of Rain by Richard Greenberg (Michigan premiere)
Picasso at the Lapin Agile by Steve Martin (Michigan premiere)
The Ride Down Mt. Morgan by Arthur Miller (Michigan premiere)
...and Associates by Jerry Lax and Ed Stein (world premiere)

The 1998–99 Season:
(Johanna Broughton, executive director)
Avenue X: An A Cappella Musical book & lyrics by John Jiler, music by Ray Leslee 
The Talking Cure by Rachel Urist (world premiere)
Innocent Thoughts by William Missouri Downs (Michigan premiere)
Private Eyes by Steven Dietz (Michigan premiere)
How I Learned To Drive by Paula Vogel (Michigan premiere)
The 1998 Guest presentations:
Ellipsis Theatre Ensemble's The Moon Wolf 
Jesse Richards & Hundredth Monkey's Animal Lovers Project 
MorrisCo Art Theatre's The Importance Of Being Earnest 
MOSAIC Youth Theatre's heartBEAT 
Open Theatre's Quartet 
Drake Enterprises' Moby Dick Rehearsed 
Shivaree by William Mastrosimone 
Shadow Theatre Company's Closet Land 
Autumn Dances Annual Choreographers Showcase 
1999 TreeTown Performance Festival Guest presentations June - August 1999: 
Mosaic Youth Theatre's Everybody's TalkinBrass Tacks Ensemble's King Lear 
Heartlande Theatre Company's Mainstream 
Shadow Theatre Company's Echoes 
Terpsicore's Kitchen's Summer Dances 
RAH Productions Strange Love & Unusual Sex 
Mercury Theatre Company's Office HoursThe 1997–98 Season (PNT's first Equity season): 
(Johanna Broughton, executive director)
Molly Sweeney by Brian Friel  (Michigan premiere)
The Waiting Room by Lisa Loomer  (Michigan premiere)
Inverted Pyramid by Larry Dean Harris (world premiere)
Life In Refusal by Ari Roth  (Michigan premiere)
White Picket Fence by Michael Grady (Michigan premiere)
Psychopathia Sexualis (play) by John Patrick Shanley  (Michigan premiere)The 1997-98 Guest Presentations:Autumn Dances Annual Choreographers Showcase 
Ellipsis Theatre Ensemble's Ave Maria Played Softly 
Spontaneous Me Productions's The Borstal Boy 
MorrisCo Art Theatre's Agnes of God 
Peridot Productions' No Exit 
Dutchman by LeRoi Jones (Amiri Baraka) 
The 12th Annual Raise The Roof 
Autumn Dances Annual Choreographers Showcase 
Ellipsis Theatre Ensemble's Why We Have A Body 
Walk and Squawk's Inhlanzi Ishelwe Amanzi 
The Shadow Theatre Company's The Complete Works of William Shakespeare (abridged) 
Sensible Footwear - Comedic Feminist Terrorists 
Walk and Squawk's How Could You Stoop SoLo? 
Brilliant Traces by Cindy Lou Johnson 
Basement Arts presents A Midsummer Night's Dream 
Drop Dead by Billy Van Zandt & Jane MilmoreThe 1997 Productions:Mary Goldstein & the Author by OyamO 
River Dreams by Elise Bryant 
The Tiger Bounds by Malcolm Tulip 
Viva, La Click-ka! by Rudolfo Valier Alvarado 
Some of My Best Friends Are... by Joan Lipkin, music & lyrics by Tom Clear The 1997 Guest Presentations:In the Heart of the Wood by Todd Jefferson Moore 
MorrisCo Art Theatre's Summer and Smoke 
Come Good Rain written and performed by Toronto actor/playwright George Bwanika Seremba 
Spring Dances Annual Choreographers Showcase 
Sensible Footwear - Comedic Feminist Terrorists 
Walk and Squawk presents Shameless Rainbow Youth Theater 
MorrisCo Art Theatre presents Uncle Vanya 
Dance / Partners by Terri Sarris and Patricia Plasko 
The Birthday Party by Harold Pinter 
Mosaic Youth theatre of Detroit presents What Fools These Mortals Be! 
Ellipsis Theatre Ensemble presents A Woman's Lot and Under a Rhyming Planet 
Walk & Squawk Performance Project's Who It Is

Affiliations

Performance Network Theatre was a member of the Theatre Communications Group (TCG), the National New Play Network (NNPN), Americans for the Arts, the Cultural Alliance of Southeast Michigan (CASM), the Ann Arbor Convention and Visitors Bureau (AACVB),  and the Ann Arbor Chamber of Commerce. The Theatre's activities were supported by the Michigan Council for Arts and Cultural Affairs, and the National Endowment for the Arts.

Awards

National Awards:

2013 Edgerton Foundation New American Play Award: County Line by David Wells
2011 Edgerton Foundation New American Play Award: Dead Man's Shoes by Joseph Zettelmaier
2009 Edgerton Foundation New American Play Award: It Came From Mars by Joseph Zettelmaier

Organizational Awards::
Voted "Best Local Theatre" by Metro Times readers, 2009
2006 Critics Choice and Angel Award for Outstanding Service to the LGBT
CommunityVoted "Best Theatre" by Current Magazine readers 1996–2008.
Best Overall Season by the Oakland Press 2005
The DeVine Award for Outstanding Contributions by the Detroit Free Press 2001 & 2005
Non-Profit Excellence Award nomination - Non-profit Enterprise at Work, 1997 & 2000
Governor's Arts Award nomination, 1998 & 2000

Wilde Awards:2014Best Performance, Actor - Drama: John Manfredi - An Iliad
Best Performance, Actress - Comedy: Maggie Meyer - Venus in Fur2013Best Music Direction: R. MacKenzie Lewis - Little Night Music
Best Musical: Phil Simmons, director - A Little Night Music
Best Performance, Actor - Comedy: John Seibert - In the Next Room or The Vibrator Play
Best Performance, Actor – Musical: John Seibert - A Little Night Music
Best Performance, Actress – Musical: Naz Edwards - A Little Night Music2012Best Design - Sets: Monika Essen - Red
Best New Script: Joseph Zettelmaier - Dead Man's Shoes2011Best Comedy: John Seibert, director - Circle Mirror Transformation
Best New Script: Kim Carney - The War Since Eve
Best Performance, Actor - Musical: Phil Powers - The Drowsy Chaperone2010Best Actor - Comedy: Jacob Hodgson - It Came From Mars
Best Actress - Comedy: Suzi Regan - The Blonde, the Brunette and the Vengeful Redhead
Best Design - Lights: Andrew Hungerford - K2
Best Design - Props: Charles Sutherland - It Came From Mars
Best Drama: Tim Edward Rhoze, director - K2
Best Musical: Carla Milarch, director - Little Shop of Horrors
Best Production of a New Script: Tony Caselli, director - It Came From Mars
Best Support - Musical: Aaron T. Moore - Little Shop of Horrors
Best Teamwork: James Bowen & John Michael Manfredi - K22009Best Actress – Drama: Inga Wilson - A Feminine Ending
Best Improv, Cabaret or Original Production: Malcolm Tulip, director - The Day Everything Went Wrong
Best Performer – Play with LGBT Themes or Characters: Roxanne Wellington - The Little Dog Laughed
Best Production with LGBT Themes or Characters: Ray Schultz - The Little Dog Laughed2008Best Actor – DRAMA: Jon Bennett - Doubt
Best Actress – DRAMA: Jan Radcliff - Doubt
Best Actress – ORIGINAL / IMPROV / LGBT THEMES: Carla Milarch - Dirty Blonde
Best Local Professional DRAMA: John Seibert, director - Doubt
Best Local Professional Production with LGBT Themes or Characters: Jim Posante, director - Dirty Blonde
Best Technical Design - Set: Monika Essen - The Baker's Wife2007Best Actor – DRAMA: Malcolm Tulip - Amadeus
Best Local Professional DRAMA: Malcolm Tulip, director - Amadeus
Best Local Professional Production with LGBT Themes or Characters: Gillian Eaton, director - I Am My Own Wife2006Best Lead Actor – DRAMA: Ray Schultz - Take Me Out
Best Lead Actress – DRAMA: Carmen Decker - Moonglow
Best Supporting Actor – DRAMA: Darrell Glasgow - Take Me Out
Favorite Local Professional Production – COMEDY: Tony Caselli, director - Jacob Marley's Christmas Carol
Favorite Local Professional Production with LGBT Themes or Characters: Jim Posante & Tony Caselli, directors - Take Me Out2005Best Female Performer in a Local Professional Production – COMEDY: Gillian Eaton - Humble Boy
Best Supporting Female Performer in a Local Professional Production – COMEDY: Laurel Hufano - Boston Marriage2004Favorite Local Professional Production with LGBT Themes or Characters: James Posante, director - The Home Team
Favorite Male Performer in a Local Professional Production – COMEDY: David Wolber - The Home Team
Favorite Performer in a Local Professional Production – MUSICAL: Rochelle Rosenthal - The Threepenny Opera2003Favorite Local Professional Production – MUSICAL / MUSICAL REVUE: Malcolm Tulip, director - Man of La Mancha
Favorite Performer in a Local Professional Production – MUSICAL: Robert Grossman - Man of La Mancha2002Best Local Professional Production – COMEDY: Carla Milarch, director - Special Relativity
Best Performer in a Local Professional Production – DRAMA: Michelle Murphy - Stop Kiss

Rogue's Gallery Award Winners2013 WinnersScenic Design (Proscenium Seating): Daniel C. Walker, Brill
Lead Actress (Drama): Carla Milarch, The Glass Menagerie
Lead Actress (Musical): Naz Edwards, A Little Night Music
Lead Actor (Musical): John Seibert, A Little Night Music2012 WinnersNew Play or Adaptation: Joseph Zettelmaier, Dead Man's Shoes
Lighting Design (Proscenium Seating): Justin Lang, Red
Lead Actress (Drama): Suzi Regan, Time Stands Still
Properties Design: Monika Essen, Red
Best Rogue: Drew Parker, Dead Man's Shoes [TIE] 2011 WinnersBest Musical: The Drowsy Chaperone (director Carla Milarch)
Choreography (Dance): Phil Simmons, The Drowsy Chaperone
Lead Actor (Drama): Andrew Huff, Next Fall

Rogue's Gallery Award Nominees:2013 NomineesBest Drama: The Glass Menagerie (director Tim Rhoze) 
Best Musical: A Little Night Music (director Phil Simmons) 
Sound Design: Carla Milarch, Good People
Duo or Trio: Sarab Kamoo and David Wolber, Becky Shaw
Best Rogue: Alex Leydenfrost, Good People
Lead Actress (Drama): Carollette Phillips, The Mountaintop
Lead Actor (Drama): Brian Marable, The Mountaintop
Lead Actor (Drama): Kevin Young, The Glass Menagerie
Supporting Actress (Drama): Naz Edwards, My Name is Asher Lev
Lead Actress (Comedy): Suzi Regan, Good People
Lead Actor (Comedy): Phil Powers, Brill
Supporting Actress (Comedy): MaryJo Cuppone, Good People
Supporting Actress (Comedy): Maggie Meyer, Becky Shaw
Supporting Actress (Musical): Leslie Hull, A Little Night Music2012 Nominees'''
Best Drama: Time Stands Still (director Kate Peckham)
Best Comedy: God of Carnage (director David J. Magidson) 
Best Musical: Ain't Misbehavin (director Tim Edward Rhoze) 
Scenic Design (Proscenium Seating): Monika Essen, Red
Lighting Design (Proscenium Seating): Mary Cole, Burn This
Sound Design: Will Myers, Dead Man's Shoes
Properties Design: Monika Essen, God of Carnage
Choreography (Dance): Robin Wilson, Ain't Misbehavin'''
Choreography (Movement or Fight): Joseph Zettelmaier, Burn ThisEnsemble (2–4): God of CarnageEnsemble (5 or more): Ain't Misbehavin
Best Rogue: Darrell Glasgow, Burn This
Lead Actor (Drama): Mark Rademacher, Red
Supporting Actress (Drama): Heidi Bennett, Time Stands Still
Supporting Actress (Comedy): Leslie Hull, In the Next Room or the vibrator play
2011 Nominees
Best Drama: Sonia Flew (director David Wolber)
Best Comedy: The War Since Eve (director David Wolber)
New Play or Adaptation: Kim Carney, The War Since Eve
Lighting Design (Proscenium Seating): Daniel C. Walker, Marie Antoinette: The Color of Flesh
Properties Design: Charles Sutherland, The Piano Lesson
Ensemble (2–4): Marie Antoinette: The Color of Flesh
Ensemble (5 or more): The Piano Lesson
Ensemble (5 or more): Sonia Flew
Supporting Actor (Drama): John Seibert, Next Fall
Supporting Actress (Comedy): Sarah Ann Leahy, Circle Mirror Transformation
Lead Actress (Musical): Andrea Mellos, The Drowsy Chaperone
Supporting Actress (Musical): Naz Edwards, The Drowsy Chaperone
Supporting Actor (Musical): Matt Anderson, The Drowsy Chaperone
Supporting Actor (Musical): Scott Crownover, The Drowsy Chaperone

AnnArbor.com::
Best Local Play 2009: The Blonde, the Brunette and the Vengeful Redhead, David Wolber, director
Best Acting Performances (male) 2009: John Manfredi, A Picasso, Will Myers, A Feminine Ending, James Bowen, Fences, Malcolm Tulip, Rosencrantz and Guildenstern are Dead
Best Acting Performances (female) 2009: Inga Wilson, A Feminine Ending, Sheila Alyce Slaughter, Fences, Suzi Regan, The Blonde, the Brunette and the Vengeful Redhead
Best Tech Achievements 2009: Monika Essen's set for Fences, Daniel C. Walker's lighting design for Rosencrantz and Guildenstern are Dead and Christmas Carol'd
Best Locally Produced Show (2008): Doubt, John Seibert, director
Best Performance (female) 2008: Jan Radcliffe, Doubt; Sarab Kamoo, 9 Parts of Desire
Best Performance (male) 2008: Jon Bennett, Doubt, Robert Grossman, Exits and Entrances
Favorite On-Stage Moments 2008: Roxanne Wellington and Barton Bund's power lunch in The Little Dog Laughed; Tom Whalen & Jim Porterfield's reconciliation scene, Geoffrey and Jeffrey
Best Tech Achievements 2008: Daniel C. Walker's set for Doubt, Monika Essen's set for 9 Parts of Desire and Geoffrey and Jeffrey, Vincent Mountain's set for The Day Everything Went Wrong

Ann Arbor News:
Best New Play 2007: Language Lessons, Joseph Zettelmaier
Best Female Performance 2007 (tie): Carla Milarch, Dirty Blonde; Aphrodite Nikolovski, Language Lessons and The Clean House; Terry Heck, Language Lessons
Best Male Performance 2007 (tie): Malcolm Tulip, Amadeus; Phil Powers, Dirty Blonde; John Seibert, The Baker's Wife
Best Set Designer 2007: Monika Essen, designer
Best Performance by a New Face 2007: Jacob Hodgson, Candida
Best Production 2007: Amadeus, Malcolm Tulip, director
Best Lead Actress 2006: Carmen Decker, Moonglow
Best Lead Actor 2006: Malcolm Tulip, I Am My Own Wife
Best Supporting Actor 2006: Loren Bass, Moonglow
Best New Play 2006: Kim Carney's Moonglow
Best Lead Actress 2005: Mindy Woodhead, Summer and Smoke
Best Director 2005: Tony Caselli, Summer and Smoke
Best Technical Achievement 2005: Monika Essen's set for Summer and Smoke
Best Production 2005: Summer and Smoke

Detroit Free Press Awards:
Best Play 2006: Take Me Out
Best Director 2006: Jim Posante & Tony Caselli, Take Me Out
Best Featured Actor 2006: Darrell Glasgow, Take Me Out
Best Featured Actress 2005: Laurel Hufano, Boston Marriage
Award for Outstanding Contribution to Theater in a season 2005: Gillian Eaton, Humble Boy, Boston Marriage
Best Director 2003: Malcolm Tulip, Man of La Mancha
Best Featured Actress 2003: Terry Heck, Necessary Targets
Best Actress 2002: Gillian Eaton, Elizabeth Rex
Award for Outstanding Contributions to Theatre 2001: Johanna Broughton and Daniel C. Walker
Best Actress 2001: Jan Radcliff, Wit

References

External links
Performance Network website
/ Davi Napoleon's history of the Performance Network in the Ann Arbor Observer.

Culture of Ann Arbor, Michigan
Theatre companies in Michigan
Tourist attractions in Ann Arbor, Michigan
Theatre in Michigan